Epureni is a commune in Vaslui County, Western Moldavia, Romania. It is composed of four villages: Bârlălești, Bursuci, Epureni and Horga.

References

Communes in Vaslui County
Localities in Western Moldavia